The men's 5000 metres relay at the 2007 Asian Winter Games was held on January 30 and 31, 2007 at Wuhuan Gymnasium, China.

Schedule
All times are China Standard Time (UTC+08:00)

Results
Legend
DNF — Did not finish

Semifinals

Heat 1

Heat 2

Final

References

Semifinals
Finals

External links
Official website

Men Relay